Anna Maria of Brandenburg-Ansbach (28 December 1526 – 20 May 1589) was a German princess of Brandenburg-Ansbach.

Early life 
Anna Maria was born at Jägerndorf, the eldest daughter of George, Margrave of Brandenburg-Ansbach and his second wife Hedwig of Münsterberg-Oels, daughter of Charles I of Münsterberg-Oels.

Biography 
Anna Maria was brought up as a Lutheran and on 24 February 1544 became the wife of Christoph, Duke of Württemberg. She later acted as guardian to her son Ludwig III, Duke of Württemberg early in his reign.  After the death of her husband Christoph she lived more than 20 years in the Nürtingen castle, she died in Nürtingen.

After losing both her husband and her eldest son in 1568, Anna Maria fell madly in love with the young Landgrave George I of Hesse-Darmstadt (1547–1596). Soon afterwards she became mentally confused and was locked up.  George I later married her daughter Eleonore.

She died in 1589 and was buried in the St. George's Collegiate Church in Tübingen.

1526 births
1589 deaths
People from Nürtingen
German princesses
Duchesses of Württemberg
Daughters of monarchs